Henry XI may refer to:

 Henry XI of Głogów (ca. 1435–1476)
 Henry XI of Legnica (1539–1588)